Dublin Female Penitentiary, was a reform institution for "fallen women" in Dublin, Ireland. It established in 1810 and opened in 1813, it was run by the Church of Ireland and located between Berkeley Road, Eccles St. and North Circular Road. The Asylum could cater for over 40 inmates. It was administered by a Committee of ladies, for the religious and moral improvement of the women. While inmates were from all religious backgrounds (some other such institutions only accepted women of the religion of the institution), they had to adhere to the rules of the house and were instructed in the reformed faith. As with many protestant benevolent initiatives, many laywomen were involved. Mrs. Paulus Aemilius Singer of Temple Street, served as secretary of the committee, was a notable supporter of the institution. 
Penitents were employed in a laundry washing and mangling, and also needlework, millinery and mantua-making. As with other similar institutions the penitentiary was affiliated to a chapel (St. Augustine's Church, a chapel of ease in the parish of St George). 
There was a Repository where the penitents' work was sold, with income used to fund the institution. After eighteen months places outside the laundry were sought for an inmate. Some inmates were sent to Queensland, Australia.

In 1840 the trustees put the chaplaincy under the visitation and clergy officiate under licence from the Church of Ireland Archbishop of Dublin.

Associated people 
Viscount Lorton served as Govonoress. Bart. Sir Robert Shaw acted as treasurer. Rev. William Burgh AB served as Chaplain to St. Augstines from 1826 to 1847, Rev. William Jameson (of the whiskey producing family), Chaplain, Rev. N. W. Carre, Rev. Charles Brough and Rev. Robert Halpen also served as chaplains. A Rev. John Paine Sargent A.B. and a Rev. D. Flynn was an assistant chaplain. Anne Kathrens served as Matron.

Similar institutions
Other similar protestant run institutions for "fallen women" in Ireland were
 Bethany Home, Rathgar, Dublin
 Bethesda Chapel, Dublin, the chapel had a female orphanage, and Locks Penitentiary for women
 Episcopal Chapel and Asylum for Penitent Females, Baggot Street, Dublin
 Magdalen Asylum (Denny House) Leeson Street, Dublin
 Magdalene Asylum in Cork (Sawmill Street)
 Dublin by Lamplight, Ballsbridge, Dublin
 Ulster Female Penitentiary, Belfast
 Ulster Magdalene Asylum, Belfast

References

1810 establishments in Ireland
Church of Ireland buildings and structures in Ireland
Magdalene asylums